Junior Lennin Díaz Almeida (born 1 July 1975) is a Venezuelan football manager and former player who played as a left back.

Career
Born in Mérida, Díaz played for Estudiantes de Mérida, Unión Atlético Maracaibo, Deportivo Italmaracaibo, Monagas and Llaneros de Guanare. In 2008, after suffering a severe knee injury and being released by Llaneros, he retired.

Díaz subsequently worked for the Mérida branch of the Colegio Nacional de Entrenadores de Fútbol (National School of Football Managers) and was also an assistant manager at Portuguesa and Atlético El Vigía. On 29 March 2021, he was appointed manager of Trujillanos, but resigned on 17 May.

References

External links

1977 births
Living people
People from Mérida, Mérida
Venezuelan footballers
Association football defenders
Venezuelan Primera División players
Estudiantes de Mérida players
UA Maracaibo players
Monagas S.C. players
Llaneros de Guanare players
Venezuelan football managers
Venezuelan Primera División managers
Trujillanos FC managers
20th-century Venezuelan people
21st-century Venezuelan people